This is the discography of the trance DJ and record producer Paul Oakenfold.

Albums

Studio albums

Soundtracks

Compilation albums
 Greatest Hits & Remixes, Vol. 1 (2007)
 Never Mind The Bollocks... Here's Paul Oakenfold (2011)
 Four Seasons (2012)

Live albums
 Global Underground 004 (1997)
 Global Underground 007 (1998)

DJ mixes
For both of his Global Underground mixes, see above in the Live albums section.

 Goa Mix (1994)
 Ministry of Sound: The Sessions Vol 2 (1994)
 Journeys By DJ 5: Journey Through the Spectrum (1994)
 A Voyage Into Trance (1995)
 Perfection: A Perfecto Compilation (1995)
 Perfecto Fluoro (1996)
 Fantazia Presents the House Collection 6 (1997)
 Cream Anthems 97 (1997)
 Tranceport (1998)
 Resident: Two Years of Oakenfold at Cream (1999)
 Perfecto Presents: Travelling (2000)
 Perfecto Presents: Another World (2000)
 Essential Selection Vol. 1 with Fatboy Slim (2000)
 Perfecto Presents Ibiza (2001)
 Perfecto Presents: Great Wall (2003)
 Creamfields (2004)
 Perfecto Presents: The Club (2005)
 Oakenfold Anthems (2008)
 Perfecto: Vegas (2009)
 Goa Mix 2011 (2010)
 We Are Planet Perfecto Volume 1 (2011)
 We Are Planet Perfecto Volume 2 (2012)
 We Are Planet Perfecto Volume 3: Vegas to Ibiza (2013)
 Perfecto Records Miami 2013 (2013)
 We Are Planet Perfecto Volume 4 (2014)
 25 Years of Perfecto Records (2015)
 We Are Planet Perfecto Volume 5: Back to My House (2015)
 Dreamstate Volume One (2017)
 Mount Everest - The Base Camp Mix (2018)
 Sunset at Stonehenge (2019)

Singles

1988–2010

Since 2011

Remixes

Charted remixes

Non-charting remixes

 LZ7 — "Together" (Paul Oakenfold Remix)
 Juno Reactor — "Conquistador I" (Paul Oakenfold Remix)
 Billy Idol — "One Breath Away" (Paul Oakenfold Remix)
Take That — "Happy Now" (Paul Oakenfold Remix)
Daft Punk — "C.L.U." (Paul Oakenfold Remix)
Michael Jackson — "One More Chance" (Paul Oakenfold Remix)
James Newton Howard — "Signs" (Paul Oakenfold Remix)
Hans Zimmer — "Jack Suite" (Paul Oakenfold Remix)
Maroon 5 featuring Rihanna — "If I Never See Your Face Again" (Paul Oakenfold Remix)
Britney Spears — "Gimme More" (Paul Oakenfold Remix)
Madonna — "Give It 2 Me" (Paul Oakenfold Remix)
Danny Elfman — "Rule the Planet" (Paul Oakenfold Remix)
Justin Timberlake featuring T.I. — "My Love" (Paul Oakenfold Remix)
Dave Matthew Band — "When the Worlds Ends" (Paul Oakenfold Remix)
Christophe Beck — "The Pink Panther Theme" (Paul Oakenfold Remix)
The Jackson 5 — "Dancing Machine" (Paul Oakenfold Remix)
Paul Simon — "Crazy Love, Vol. II" (Paul Oakenfold Remix)
Dave Matthews Band — "When the World Ends" (Paul Oakenfold Remix)
David Arnold — "James Bond Theme" (Bond vs. Oakenfold)
Jan Johnston — "Unafraid" (Paul Oakenfold Remix)
Bruno Mars — "Locked Out Of Heaven" (Paul Oakenfold Remix)
Hans Zimmer — "Interstellar Theme" (Paul Oakenfold Remix)
Madonna — "Celebration" (Paul Oakenfold Remix)
Jennifer Lopez — "I'm Glad" (Paul Oakenfold   Perfecto Remix)
Clint Mansell — "Æternal" (Paul Oakenfold Remix)
Muse — "New Born" (Paul Oakenfold Remix)
 N*E*R*D — "Lapdance" (Paul Oakenfold Swordfish Mix)
Giorgio Moroder — "The Chase" (Paul Oakenfold Remix)
Mylène Farmer — "Pourvu qu'elles soient douces" (Paul Oakenfold Remix)
Adele — "Rolling in the Deep" (Paul Oakenfold Remix)
Sa Dingding — "Ha Ha Li Li" (Paul Oakenfold Remix)
Peter Connelly  — "The Last Revolution Theme" (Paul Oakenfold Remix) (from "Tomb Raider: The Last Revelation")
Shawyze — "Get U Home" (Paul Oakenfold Remix)
Joyriders — "Big Brother UK Theme" (Paul Oakenfold Remix)
Kim Wilde — "Cambodia" (Paul Oakenfold Remix)
Julien-K — "Spiral" (Paul Oakenfold Remix)
Armin van Buuren —  "Communication" (Paul Oakenfold Full On Fluoro Mix)

Video albums
2001 A Voyage into Trance
2008 24:7 (Documentary & Live Concert)

Soundtracks

1999–2003
 1999 Entropy
 2000 Get Carter
 2000 UEFA Euro 2000
 2000 Kevin & Perry Go Large
 2000 Requiem for a Dream
 2000–2010 Big Brother (1–11)
 2001–2010 Celebrity Big Brother (1–7)
 2001 Swordfish: The Album
 2001 Planet of the Apes
 2001 Alias
 2002 The Bourne Identity
 2002 Marvel's Blade II: Bloodhunter
 2002 Birds of Prey: Primal Scream
 2002 Austin Powers: Goldmember
 2003 Fastlane
 2003 Die Another Day
 2003 The Matrix Reloaded
 2003 NBC Las Vegas
 2003 Hollywood Homicide

2004–2007
 2004 Appleseed
 2004 Big Brother's Efourum
 2004 GoldenEye: Rogue Agent
 2004 Collateral
 2004 Big Brother Panto
 2005 FIFA Football 2005
 2006 The Pink Panther
 2006 The O.C.
 2006 Studio 60 on the Sunset Strip
 2006 The Best of Celebrity Big Brother
 2007 Pirates of the Caribbean: At World's End
 2007 Nobel Son
 2007 Forza Motorsport 2
 2007 Vexille
 2007 Shoot 'Em Up
 2007 The Game Plan
 2007 Fred Claus

2008–present
 2008 Drive Thru: Japan
 2008 Californication
 2008 The Heavy
 2008 Fever
 2008 The Bourne Conspiracy
 2008 Speed Racer
 2008 Nothing Like the Holidays
 2008 Interzone Futebol
 2010 Ultimate Big Brother
 2010 EA Sports FIFA Superstars
 2011–2018 Big Brother (12–) 
 2011–2018 Celebrity Big Brother (8–)

References

Discographies of British artists
Electronic music discographies